Bessie Marshall Whitely or Whiteley (December 25, 1871 - November 7, 1944 was an American composer, pianist, and teacher. She attended the Oakland Conservatory of Music in Oakland, California,  and studied with H. G. Pasmore, J. P. Morgan, and Louis Lesser. Whitely was a piano teacher and music supervisor in Kansas City, Missouri, for 32 years.

Whitely published an article on Form and Spirit in Music in the journal Music in 1892. Her opera Hiawatha's Childhood won the National Federation of Music Clubs award in 1912. Her music was published by G. Schirmer, Inc. and C. C. Birchard & Co. (later Summy-Birchard, then Birchtree Ltd.). Her compositions include:

Opera 
Hiawatha's Childhood (for unchanged voices; composer) 
Pandora (text based on Henry Wadsworth Longfellow's Masque of Pandora)
Sarita

Orchestra 

Five Symphonic Sketches

Vocal 

Four Winds (men's quartet)

Garden of Buddha (woman's voice + men's quartet)

Goblin (words by Florence C. Fox; music by Bessie Marshall Whitely) 

Hymn

Landing of the Pilgrims

Missouri

Muramadzu (tenor and orchestra)

Shadows (voice and piano; unspecified award winner)

Three Madrigals (a capella chorus)

References 

1871 births
1944 deaths
American opera composers
Women opera composers